Gymnocarena apicata is a species of tephritid or fruit flies in the genus Gymnocarena of the family Tephritidae.

Distribution
United States.

References

Tephritinae
Insects described in 1914
Diptera of North America